Stewarts Point is an unincorporated community in southeast Nevada, just about 30 miles (48 km) east of Las Vegas. It is located in Clark County.

References

Lake Mead National Recreation Area
Unincorporated communities in Clark County, Nevada
Unincorporated communities in Nevada